The St. Petersburg Ladies' Trophy (formerly known as the Ladies Neva Cup) is a tournament for professional female tennis players played on indoor hardcourts. The event is classified as a WTA 500 tournament and was first held in St. Petersburg in 2003.

History
The event is held since 2003 in St. Petersburg. It was an ITF Women's Circuit event until 2015. In 2016, it was upgraded to a WTA Premier tournament in 2016, offering a prize money of $753,000, up from only $25,000 and $50,000 in previous years.

The event replaced the Proximus Diamond Games on the WTA Tour from 2016.

Past finals

Singles

Doubles

See also
 St. Petersburg Open – men's tournament

References

External links 
 WTA Official page
 Official website 
 Official website 

 
ITF Women's World Tennis Tour
WTA Tour
Hard court tennis tournaments
Indoor tennis tournaments
Tennis tournaments in Russia
Sports competitions in Saint Petersburg
Recurring sporting events established in 2003
2003 establishments in Russia